I Luv NY (International title: I Love New York) is a 2006 Philippine television drama romance series broadcast by GMA Network. The series is the first Philippine television drama series filmed in New York City. It stars Jolina Magdangal, Jennylyn Mercado, Mark Herras and Marvin Agustin. It premiered on May 15, 2006 on the network's Telebabad line up. The series concluded on September 8, 2006 with a total of 85 episodes. It was replaced by Bakekang in its timeslot.

Cast and characters

Lead cast
 Jolina Magdangal as Apolinaria "Polly" Balumbalunan
 Marvin Agustin as Albert Sandoval
 Jennylyn Mercado as Natalie Young
 Mark Herras as Sebastian "Baste" Santos

Supporting cast
 Isabel Oli as Wendy
 Alfred Vargas as Sebastian "Seb" Santos
 Tirso Cruz III as Edward Young
 William Martinez as Joaquin Santos
 Carmi Martin as Diane Young
 Yayo Aguila as Susan Santos
 Caridad Sanchez as Juliana
 Mike Tan as Jero
 LJ Reyes as Ponyang
 Gabby Eigenmann as Paul Young
 Krizzy Jareño as Shayne Young
 Kirby de Jesus as Sunshine
 Neil Ferreira as Billy
 Raymon Salvador as Kapitan Harabas
 Tetchie Agbayani as Polly's mother
 Tess Bomb as Ging
 Arnell Ignacio as Chichi Florence LaRoux
 Jocas de Leon as a hotel supervisor
 Tiya Pusit as Esther
 Craig Scribner as an immigration officer

Guest cast
 Gerald Santos as Gerry Balumbalunan
 Jonalyn Viray as Jenny de Castro
 Joey de Leon as himself
 Allan K. as himself
 Sugar Mercado as herself

References

External links
 

2006 Philippine television series debuts
2006 Philippine television series endings
Filipino-language television shows
GMA Network drama series
Philippine romance television series
Television shows set in New York City
Television shows set in the Philippines